"Heaven" is a song by Irish singer Niall Horan, released through Capitol Records as the lead single from his upcoming third studio album The Show on 17 February 2023.

Background
In an interview with Rolling Stone, Horan shared, "There's so much pressure for people to hit certain milestones by a certain age – you get married at this age, buy a house at that age, have kids at some other age [...] But I've never conformed to those ideas, and so I wanted to write about how we all should just focus on enjoying our lives and doing what feels right, instead of worrying about what might be expected of us."

Composition
The song was originally published in the key of F major and starts with F(add2)/Gm/F/F5/G7sus/Bbsus2 chord progression with six intro bars. The song begins with the lyric: "Strange light revolves around you, you float across the room. Your touch is made of something heaven can't hold a candle to.".

Promotion
In February 2023, Horan performed the "Heaven" chorus acoustically whilst appearing on the The Late Late Show with James Corden. He appeared on The Kelly Clarkson Show and discussed writing the song at a writer's camp. Horan released an acoustic version of "Heaven" on 10 March 2023, which had been preceded one week earlier by a video released to YouTube of the acoustic version. Horan appeared on The Jonathan Ross Show on 11 March 2023. On 17 March 2023, Horan performed "Heaven" at the White House's Saint Patrick's Day celebrations.

Music video
On 17 February 2023, Horan released a lyric video to "Heaven", which was produced by Katie Temkin. On 24 February 2023, the official music video was released online. The video was directed by Dylan Knight. Drummer Emilia Schmier features throughout.

Chart performance
One week after the single's release, "Heaven" debuted at number 4 on the Irish singles chart, Horan's highest charting single in the country since 2017's "Slow Hands". In the United Kingdom, the single debuted at number 18, peaking one week later at number 16. In the Netherlands Heaven debuted at number 26. In Sweden, "Heaven" debuted at number 54 on that country's singles chart. In the United States, it debuted at number 63 on the Billboard Hot 100 and peaked at number 62. In Australia, the single peaked at number 30 on the country's ARIA Chart.

One week after the single's release, the UK's Official Charts Company reported "Heaven" peaked at number 2 on the Official Trending Chart.

Charts

Release history

References

2023 singles
2023 songs
Capitol Records singles
Niall Horan songs